Neumayer-Station or Neumayer-Station II was a permanent German Antarctic research base on Atka Bay. It opened in 1992, replacing the old Georg-von-Neumayer-Station.

On February 20, 2009, it was replaced by the new permanent research base Neumayer-Station III. At the time, the station was moving with the shelf ice at about 200 meters per year towards the open sea.

See also
 List of Antarctic research stations
 List of Antarctic field camps

Germany and the Antarctic
Princess Astrid Coast
Outposts of Queen Maud Land
1992 establishments in Antarctica
2009 disestablishments in Antarctica